Broadside is an American sitcom that aired on ABC during the 1964–1965 TV season. The series, produced by McHale's Navy creator Edward Montagne, starred Kathleen Nolan, formerly of The Real McCoys.

Synopsis
The series centered on the women of the Navy (WAVES) on "a supply base somewhere in the South Pacific, 1944," who found themselves transferred to the island of Ranakai to run the motorpool in an otherwise all-male environment. Lt. Anne Morgan (Kathleen Nolan) was in command of the man-crazy, wisecracking Selma Kowalski (Sheila James), the alternately chipper and worried Molly McGuire (Lois Roberts), the slow-witted blonde and former exotic dancer Roberta Love (Joan Staley), and the unit's only male recruit, Marion Botnik (Jimmy Boyd), assigned to the WAVES due to a clerical error.

Their nemesis was the rarefied Commander Roger Adrian (Edward Andrews), who regarded the war as a major intrusion on his idyllic, luxurious lifestyle; he felt that the WAVES experiment would attract official government supervision, endangering his private paradise. Adrian and his easily flustered junior officer Ensign Beasley (George Furth) constantly conspired to get rid of the WAVES, while executive officer Lt. Max Trotter (Dick Sargent) and streetwise sailor Nicky D'Angelo (Don Edmonds) sided with the girls in their counter-attacks on Adrian. Completing the ensemble was Adrian's fussy personal chef Bernard (Richard Jury).

Producer Montagne had produced movie short subjects starring comedian Arnold Stang in the early 1950s. Midway through the Broadside run, Montagne recruited Stang to join the series and gave him co-star billing. Stang replaced both Richard Jury and Don Edmonds in the ensemble cast. He appeared as outspoken master chef Stanley Stubbs, reunited with his high-school classmate Selma of the WAVES motor pool.

Broadside boasted clever scripts and good direction by the McHale's Navy staff, and enthusiastic performances by the ensemble cast. As it was a rule that vehicles on set could only be operated by union members, the cast playing drivers got honorary Teamsters’ cards.

Though ratings were not bad, the series ran for just a single season. The executives at Universal Studios felt the tropical exteriors being used by Broadside and McHale's Navy—and nothing else—were taking up too much space on the backlot, so Broadside was cancelled and the setting for McHale's Navy was changed to Italy, which could be shot on the studio's more frequently used sets with European facades).

Cast
 Kathleen Nolan as Lieutenant Anne Morgan
 Edward Andrews as Commander Roger Adrian
 Dick Sargent as Lieutenant Maxwell Trotter
 Jimmy Boyd as Marion Botnik
 George Furth as Ensign Beasley
 Sheila James as Selma Kowalski
 Lois Roberts as Molly Maguire
 Joan Staley as Roberta Love
 Arnold Stang as Seaman 1st Class Stanley Stubbs

Episodes

References

External links

 

1964 American television series debuts
1965 American television series endings
1960s American sitcoms
American Broadcasting Company original programming
American television spin-offs
Black-and-white American television shows
English-language television shows
Military comedy television series
Television series by Universal Television
World War II television comedy series
Television series set in 1944
McHale's Navy